He Ying Ying or Hor Ying Ying (born 28 January 1995) is a Singaporean actress.

Early life and education 
He Ying Ying was born into a family made up of her father, businessman, her mother, a preschool educator, and a brother. She was educated at Anderson Junior College before she finished her studies at the National University of Singapore with a Bachelor of Arts (Communications and New Media) in July 2017.

Career
In 2015, while still studying in NUS, He Ying Ying was scouted by Ben Yeo and Kate Pang on campus to join the talent scouting competition, Hey Gorgeous, which was aired on Mediacorp Channel 8. She was eventually placed as one of the two runner-ups in the competition. Through the competition, she started considering joining the showbiz industry.

By December 2016, He Ying Ying had signed with Mediacorp's talent management agency, The Celebrity Agency. She appeared in various dramas mostly with cameo appearances and supporting roles in television dramas, before taking on the lead role in Run Rachael Run, in which she was nominated for the Best Leading Actress award in the 2016 Bilbao Web Fest. For her work in Hero, she also gained a nomination for Top 10 Most Popular Female Artistes in Star Awards 2017.

After having graduated in July 2017, Ying Ying then turned to full-time acting as a career. She took up supporting roles in 118 II, a 218-episode long-running drama for which, she was nominated for the Best Newcomer award in Star Awards 2018. In 2018, Ying Ying reprised her role for the 2018 sequel to 118 II, 118 Reunion. She also took on two roles in Reach for the Skies, another Long-running drama, playing twins who are in love with the same male character.

In 2019, among the various dramas she had acted in 2018, she was nominated for the Best Supporting Actress award in Star Awards 2019 for her role in A Million Dollar Dream.  She filmed Walk With Me, Voyage Of Love, Dear Neighbours, C.L.I.F. 5 and After The Stars.

Filmography

Discography

Compilation album

Awards and nominations

References

External links
 
 
 He Ying Ying profile on The Celebrity Agency

1995 births
Living people
Singaporean people of Chinese descent
Singaporean film actresses
Singaporean television actresses
Singaporean television personalities
21st-century Singaporean actresses